Myron Donovan Crocker (September 4, 1915 – February 2, 2010) was a United States district judge of the United States District Court for the Southern District of California and the United States District Court for the Eastern District of California.

Education and career

Born in Pasadena, California, Crocker received an Artium Baccalaureus degree from Fresno State College (now California State University, Fresno) in 1937 and a Bachelor of Laws from the UC Berkeley School of Law in 1940. He was a special agent with the Federal Bureau of Investigation from 1940 to 1946. He entered private practice in Chowchilla, California in 1946, and was an assistant district attorney of Madera County, California from 1946 to 1951. He was then a Judge of the Chowchilla Justice Court from 1952 to 1958, and on the Superior Court of Madera County from 1958 to 1959.

Federal judicial service
Crocker was nominated by President Dwight D. Eisenhower on February 16, 1959, to a seat on the United States District Court for the Southern District of California vacated by Judge Gilbert H. Jertberg. He was confirmed by the United States Senate on September 14, 1959, and received his commission on September 21, 1959. Crocker was reassigned by operation of law on September 18, 1966, to the United States District Court for the Eastern District of California, to a new seat authorized by 80 Stat. 75. He served as Chief Judge from 1966 to 1967. He assumed senior status on January 1, 1981. His service terminated on February 2, 2010, due to his death in Chowchilla. He was the last surviving appointee from the Eisenhower administration remaining on the federal bench.

See also
 List of United States federal judges by longevity of service

References

Sources
 

1915 births
2010 deaths
California state court judges
Judges of the United States District Court for the Southern District of California
Judges of the United States District Court for the Eastern District of California
United States district court judges appointed by Dwight D. Eisenhower
20th-century American judges
Federal Bureau of Investigation agents
California State University, Fresno alumni
UC Berkeley School of Law alumni